Sriram College of Arts and Science is a college in Perumalpattu, Tiruvallur Dt., Tamil Nadu, India. Science and arts courses offered include BSc (Bachelor of Science), BCA (Bachelor of Computer Application), MSc (Master of Science), M.S.W, B.Com. and B.B.A.

References

External links
 

Arts colleges in India
Colleges affiliated to University of Madras
Education in Tiruvallur district
Educational institutions established in 1998
1998 establishments in Tamil Nadu